Lulu International Shopping Mall may refer to:

Lulu International Shopping Mall, Kochi, a shopping mall located in Kochi, Kerala.
Lulu International Shopping Mall, Thiruvananthapuram, located in Thiruvananthapuram, Kerala.
Lulu International Shopping Mall, Lucknow, located in Lucknow, Uttar Pradesh.

See also
 LuLu Group International